Corticium may refer to two different genera:
 Corticium (fungus), a genus of fungi
 Corticium (sponge), a genus of sea sponges in the family Plakinidae